A crisp sandwich (in British English and Irish English) is a sandwich that includes crisps as the filling, or on its own (crisps only in bread). In addition to the crisps, any other common sandwich ingredient may be added.

Regional variations 
Crisp sandwiches are also called piece and crisps (in Scottish English), chippy sandwich (in Australian English), chip sandwich, crispwich, crisp sarnie, crisp butty, or crip sambo. They are popular in the United Kingdom and Ireland. In 2015, crisp sandwich shops opened in Belfast and West Yorkshire, both of which claim to be the world's first.

In Ireland, crisp sandwiches are also often called Tayto sandwiches in reference to the popular Irish crisp brand and its Northern Irish counterpart. The Irish airline Aer Lingus offered a Tayto sandwich pack as part of their in-flight menu from 2015 to 2016. In 2015, a pop-up shop was opened by Tayto in Dublin to raise funds for charity, and a similar shop was opened for December 2016. In 2018, the sandwiches were offered through Deliveroo for a limited period. An Irish pub in New York City sells an adaptation of the crisp sandwich as part of its Irish menu.

In the United States, the potato chip sandwich has been around since at least the 1950s.

See also
 Chip butty, a sandwich made with chips (French fries)
 List of sandwiches
 List of potato dishes

References

Potato dishes
British sandwiches
Irish cuisine